Nikolay Nikolov (born 29 July 1986) is a Bulgarian volleyball player.

Awards

Individual
 2015 FIVB Club World Championship - Best Middle Blocker

References

External links
FIVB Player's biography 2012

1986 births
Living people
People from Karnobat
Bulgarian men's volleyball players
Volleyball players at the 2012 Summer Olympics
Olympic volleyball players of Bulgaria
Volleyball players at the 2015 European Games
European Games medalists in volleyball
European Games silver medalists for Bulgaria
Bulgarian expatriates in Italy
Bulgarian expatriates in Russia
Expatriate volleyball players in Iran
Expatriate volleyball players in Italy
Expatriate volleyball players in Russia
Sporting CP volleyball players